Norman Ewart "Odie" Lowe (April 15, 1928 – June 29, 2021) was a Canadian professional ice hockey player who played three games in the National Hockey League with the New York Rangers during the 1949–50 season. The rest of his career, which lasted from 1947 to 1961, was spent in various minor and senior leagues. He died on June 29, 2021.

Career statistics

Regular season and playoffs

References

External links
 

1928 births
2021 deaths
Canadian expatriate ice hockey players in the United States
Canadian ice hockey centres
New York Rangers players
New York Rovers players
St. Paul Saints (USHL) players
Ice hockey people from Winnipeg
Western International Hockey League players
Winnipeg Canadians players
Winnipeg Rangers players